Takamura (written:  lit. "high village" or  lit. "hawk village") is a Japanese surname. Notable people with the surname include:

Overview 
Chieko Takamura (1886–1938), Japanese poet, wife of Kotaro Takamura
Kaoru Takamura (born 1953), Japanese novelist and essayist
Kotaro Takamura (1883–1956), Japanese poet and sculptor, son of Koun Takamura
Tadashi Takamura (born 1933), Japanese photographer
Takamura Kōun (1851–1934), Japanese sculptor
Luke Takamura (born 1964), Japanese guitarist
Mariko Takamura, cultural icon for the deaf in Japan
, Japanese handball player

Fictional characters
Corinne (Corey) Takamura, character from the children's book series The Saddle Club
Eiko Takamura, character from the Japanese drama Haruka 17
Dr. Fuji Takamura, character in the film Highlander III: The Sorcerer
Keiko Takamura, character from the anime series Uta Kata
Koji Takamura, character from the manga series Clamp School Paranormal Investigators
Mamoru Takamura, character from the manga/anime series Fighting Spirit (はじめの一歩, Hajime no Ippo)
Masaki Takamura (Mason Templar), from the manga/anime series Miracle Girls
Shouichirou Takamura, human guise of the monster of the week in the Tokusatsu TV series, Gosei Sentai Dairanger
Suou Takamura, character from manga/anime series Clamp School Detectives
Tsubaki Takamura, character in the anime series Sakura Wars
Yukari Takamura, character from the anime OVA Blazing Transfer Student
Hiroka Takamura, minor character from the manga/anime series Shadow Star

See also
Ono no Takamura (also known as Sangi no Takamura) (802–853), an early Heian period scholar and poet

Japanese-language surnames